Ahn Young-mi (Hanja: 安英美, born November 5, 1983), is a South Korean comedian. She made her debut in KBS' Gag Concert 19th class in 2004 and is best known for her provocative wit. In 2018, she joined the comedy-girl group Celeb Five. Young-mi is also known as the first female MC of the South Korean talk show, Radio Star since 2019.

Personal life 
In January 2023, Ahn's agency confirmed that she was pregnant with her first child and was due in July 2023.

Philanthropy 
On August 17, 2022, Ahn made an anonymous donation to help those affected by the 2022 South Korean floods through the Hope Bridge Korea Disaster Relief Association.

Filmography

Television series

Television show
Radio Star (2019–present)
Gamsung Camping (2020)
 Sister Shoots (2021)
 Chart Sisters (2022; Host with  Celeb Five Member)
 Filthy Village (2022) - Host

Web shows

Awards and nominations

State honors

Notes

References

External links

 Ahn Young-mi on instagram

1983 births
Living people
South Korean women comedians
South Korean television personalities
People from Wonju
Gag Concert
YG Entertainment artists
Best Variety Performer Female Paeksang Arts Award (television) winners